Marc Alexander is a New Zealand politician.

Marc Alexander may also refer to:

 Marc Alexander (academic) (born 1983), linguist and academic
 Marc R. Alexander (born 1958), former Catholic priest

See also
Marc Alexandre (born 1959), French judoka

Mark Alexander (disambiguation)